Philippa Namutebi Kabali-Kagwa (born 1964) is a Ugandan author, a life and personal coach, living in Cape Town, South Africa. She spoke at TEDxTableMountain and TEDxPrinceAlbert in 2012. Her memoir, Flame and Song, was published in 2016.

Childhood and Education

Philippa was born in Kampala, Uganda, in 1964. She is the youngest daughter of Ugandan poet 
Christopher Henry Muwanga Barlow and Fayce Lois Watsemwa Barlow (née Kutosi). She went to Nakasero Primary School, and then Gayaza High School. Her family left Uganda to live in Ethiopia when Archbishop Luwum was killed. She then joined Kenya High School where she did both her "O" and "A" levels. She joined Makerere University and spent a year as an occasional student in the department of Music, Dance and Drama. In 1984 she joined Kenyatta University to pursue a Degree in Education. She graduated in 1987 with B.ED Hons in Music and Literature.

Published works

Memoir

Children's books

Short stories
"How to tell your story" in

Poetry
"At the gates of Mulago I, II and II" and "Death of an Archbishop" in 
"Velvet Skies" in 
"Destiny" and "Serenade" in 
"To you my friend" in

References

External links 
"Stories of activism, exile and leadership", January 2016.
"A Dashing Day: the magic of making books for children", Books Live, 6 March 2016
"Seing self is vital in story for kids", Daily Dispatch, 6 June 2016.
"OUR AIM IN THE FESTIVAL IS TO INCLUDE A RANGE OF GENRES AND WRITERS", Blown Away By Books, The Friends of the Fish Hoek Library.

20th-century Ugandan poets
Living people
1964 births
21st-century Ugandan poets
20th-century Ugandan women writers
21st-century Ugandan women writers
People from Kampala District
Kenyatta University alumni
Alumni of Kenya High School
People educated at Gayaza High School